Hendiadys (a Latinized form of the Greek phrase  'one through two') is a figure of speech used for emphasis—"The substitution of a conjunction for a subordination". The basic idea is to use two words linked by the conjunction "and" instead of the one modifying the other. English names for hendiadys include two for one and figure of twins. The term hendiaduo may also be used.

Use and effect 

The typical result of a hendiadys is to transform a noun-plus-adjective into two nouns joined by a conjunction. For example, sound and fury (from act V, scene 5 of Macbeth) seems to offer a more striking image than "furious sound". In this example, as typically, the subordinate idea originally present in the adjective is transformed into a noun in and of itself.

Another example is Dieu et mon droit, present in the coat of arms of the United Kingdom. In fact, hendiadys is most effective in English when the adjectival and nominal forms of the word are identical. Thus "the cold wind went down the hall" becomes the cold and the wind went down the hall. He came despite rain and weather instead of "He came despite the rainy weather".

Two verbs (as in the case of a catenative verb) can be so joined: come and get it (also come get it in American English) and Fowler says that try and... for "try to..." is a "true example" of hendiadys.
The etymology of try and... is explained in a "Usage Note" in the online Merriam Webster Dictionary

The conjunction may be elided (parataxis): This coffee is nice and hot can become This is nice hot coffee; in both cases one is saying that the coffee is hot to a nice degree, not that the coffee itself would be nice even if cold.

When hendiadys fails in its effects, it can sound merely redundant. For example, the Latin grade cum amicitia atque pace, literally with friendship and peace, which originally contained hendiadys for emphasis, is often translated instead as "with peaceful friendship", which lacks hendiadys, and can therefore be interpreted to lack the same emphasis as the original phrase.

In classical and Biblical literature 
Hendiadys is often used in Latin poetry. There are many examples in Virgil's Aeneid, e.g., Book 1, line 54: vinclis et carcere, literally translated as "with chains and prison" but the phrase means "with prison chains".

 markəbǒt par‘õh wəḥêlô
the chariots of Pharaoh and his army for "the chariots of Pharaoh's army"

In , the Hebrew says ger v'toshav, literally translated as "an alien and a resident", but the phrase means a "resident alien".

In , the Hebrew says ibbad v'shibar, literally translated as "ruined and broken", but the phrase means "totally destroyed".

In , the phrase literally translated as a cloud by day, and smoke is sometimes interpreted as a hendiadys meaning "a cloud of smoke by day".

In , the Greek says "ὅσα προσεύχεσθε καὶ αἰτεῖσθε", literally translated as "whatever you pray and ask", but the phrase means "whatever you ask in prayer".

William Shakespeare uses hendiadys throughout his canon, most notably in Hamlet where their use is replete. When cautioning his sister Ophelia, Laertes makes use of this rhetorical trope repeatedly with "safety and health" (1.3.20), "voice and yielding" (1.3.22), and "morn and liquid dew" (1.3.41). Perhaps the most famous use of hendiadys in the play is Hamlet's own "Oh what a rogue and peasant slave am I” (2.2.538).

As linguistic terminology in describing Turkic languages 
Hendiadys is the preferred terminology used to describe some types of compounding in Turkic linguistics. Johanson, in his discussion of Turkic compounding, considers compounds of synonymous components to be hendiadys:The asyndetic type noun + noun is also used in coordinative compounds, so-called twin words or binomes. In this case, two parallel nouns with similar meanings form a synonym compound, hendiadys, ...or a hyponym compound to express a higher concept...

See also 

Hendiadys is different from these:
 Hendiatris, one through three does not have a subordination of parts
 Irreversible binomial, word pairs of collocation in which the order of the words cannot be reversed
 Litotes, a form of understatement for emphasis
 Merism, a figure of speech in which a whole is indicated by a brief enumeration of parts

References

Further reading
 

Rhetorical techniques